"Wait a Minute (Just a Touch)" is the lead single from British singer/rapper Estelle's second album Shine.

The single was produced by, and features, The Black Eyed Peas member will.i.am. It was made available for download on 19 November 2007 and then released physically a week later, on 26 November 2007. and the album's release is in February. It samples Screamin' Jay Hawkins' "I Put a Spell on You". The song was released in the UK only.

Music video
On 26 October 2007 the video premiered on AOL music. The video features John Legend. The video starts with Estelle walking down the street whilst at the club a bouncer (John Legend) is stopping people from going in the club. Estelle walks into the club containing artwork from artist Jon Coffelt and gets a smile from John. She dances with her man. Whilst we see them in the night club shots of Estelle sitting on some steps are shown. At the end the man and Estelle go home but the man only got a kiss from Estelle even though he expected to get more. The video was released onto UK iTunes.

Formats and track listings
UK CD (B000Y5VIL6)
 "Wait a Minute (Just a Touch)" (album version) – 4:21
 "Wait a Minute (Just a Touch)" (video) – 3:42

Digital Download
 "Wait a Minute (Just a Touch)" (album version) – 4:21

Note:
The version of "Wait a Minute (Just a Touch)" that appears on the CD single is labelled as the album version, however, the radio edit of "Wait a Minute" appears on the Shine album, meaning the extended version present on the "Wait a Minute" CD single is a single exclusive.

References

Estelle (musician) songs
Will.i.am songs
2007 singles
Songs written by will.i.am
Songs written by Estelle (musician)
2007 songs
Atlantic Records singles